Sunil Sukhada is an Indian actor in Malayalam cinema. He debuted in a small role in the film Best Actor. His first full length role was as the supermarket manager in Chappa Kurishu (2011). He won a special mention in the Kerala state television awards 2017 for Appoppanthaadi.

Personal life
He was born the second child of five children, to Sudhakara Panikkar and Saraswathiyamma, at Poothole, Thrissur. His father was a school teacher and mother a housewife. He had his primary education from Church Mission Society Higher Secondary School, Thrissur (C.M.S Boys School Thrissur) and holds a bachelor's degree in economics from Sree Kerala Varma College, Thrissur. He is unmarried.

Filmography

All films are in Malayalam language unless otherwise noted.

 Television
2023:Surabhiyum Suhasiniyum

References

External links

 Sunil Sukhada at MSI
 
 
 

Male actors from Thrissur
Male actors in Malayalam cinema
Indian male film actors
Living people
21st-century Indian male actors
1974 births